Burdett is an unincorporated community in Washington County, Mississippi.

References

Unincorporated communities in Washington County, Mississippi
Unincorporated communities in Mississippi